Dhaval Sunil Dhairyawan (19 April 1979 – 22 March 2012) was a lifestyle and automotive photographer from India. He was noted for his Photojournalism for The Times Journal of Photography, TopGear India Magazine, The Times of India and Lonely Planet Magazine. He died on 22 March 2012 due to a prolonged illness.

Piramal Art Gallery, Mumbai hosted a photo exhibition in his memory under the name, The Dhaval Dhairyawan Retrospective.

Due to his passion for automobiles, he changed the Indian outlook for automotive photography. He did several photo shoots for Top Gear Magazine which were never seen in an Indian car magazine before.

References

External links
 Official Flickr Profile

1979 births
Artists from Mumbai
Indian photojournalists
20th-century Indian photographers
Indian male journalists
2012 deaths